South and West Asia consists of a wide region extending from the present-day country of Turkey in the west to Bangladesh and India in the east.

Timeline
3rd millennium BCE Sexagesimal system of the Sumerians:
2nd millennium BCE Babylonian Pythagorean triples.  According to mathematician S. G. Dani, the Babylonian cuneiform tablet Plimpton 322 written ca. 1850 BCE "contains fifteen Pythagorean triples with quite large entries, including (13500, 12709, 18541) which is a primitive triple, indicating, in particular, that there was sophisticated understanding on the topic" in Mesopotamia.
The diagonal rope of an oblong (rectangle) produces both which the flank (pārśvamāni) and the horizontal <ropes> produce separately." Since the statement is a sūtra, it is necessarily compressed and what the ropes produce is not elaborated on, but the context clearly implies the square areas constructed on their lengths, and would have been explained so by the teacher to the student.

See also
Timeline of cultivation and domestication in South and West Asia
Timeline of mathematics

Notes

References
.
.
.
.
.
.
.
.
.
.
.
.
.
.
.
.
.
.
.
.
.
.
.
.
.
.
.
.

.
.
.
.
.
.
.

.
.
.
.
.
.
.

History of South Asia
History of Western Asia
Lists of inventions or discoveries
innovation in South and West Asia